The Hoffmantown Baptist Church, at 2335 Wyoming Blvd. NE, in a suburban area in Albuquerque, New Mexico, was listed on the National Register of Historic Places in 2019.

History 
The Hoffmantown Baptist Church was established in 1953, and in that year built a one-story brick chapel.  The church grew quickly, and built an addition in 1954, a fellowship hall in 1956; and an educational building in 1959.

It commissioned Kruger, Lake and Henderson architects in 1965 to design a larger sanctuary that could accommodate 800 persons.  This is the building that is now listed on the National Register.  The main building on the site was built in 1965, with New Formalist style, and is roughly three stories tall.  Its north-facing main facade, on Phoenix Avenue, has six colossal tapered pilasters.  The five bays of the facade are covered with a veneer of small blue tiles, and include vertically staggered windows.  The longer east facade, along Wyoming Avenue, has a similar pattern of windows and one-story pilasters which support a reinforced concrete brise soleil.  The east side also has an open-frame bell tower which was built in three stages.

The Hoffmantown Baptist Church kept growing, and began a television ministry in 1972 which continues, in 2019, to broadcast throughout New Mexico.  During the early 1980s, membership grew to 2,200, and a capital campaign raised funds to build a new, larger church at Ventura and Harper Streets.  This was built in 1986–87.

Separately, another Albuquerque church, God's House Church, originally named The House of God, was growing.  It was founded in 1916, and built a new church on Arno Street in 1959.  God's House Church purchased the entire Wyoming Blvd. campus of the Hoffmantown Baptist Church, and in 1997 opened at this location with 900 members.

The larger campus including the church also has four one- and-two-story plain brick buildings, which are the earlier buildings of the Hoffman Baptist Church built between 1953 and 1968.  These are not included in the listing.

References

External links
Hoffmantown Church: Our History
Welcome to God's House Church

Baptist churches in New Mexico
National Register of Historic Places in Albuquerque, New Mexico
Modernist architecture in New Mexico
Churches in Albuquerque, New Mexico
Churches on the National Register of Historic Places in New Mexico
New Mexico State Register of Cultural Properties